Colegio Mistral is a Chilean high school located in Las Cabras, Cachapoal Province, Chile. It was established in 1998.

References 

Educational institutions established in 1998
Secondary schools in Chile
Schools in Cachapoal Province
1988 establishments in Chile